Jóhannes Sveinsson Kjarval (15 October 1885 – 13 April 1972) was an Icelandic painter. He is considered one of the most important artists of Iceland.

Early life
Born in poverty, Kjarval was adopted and as a young man worked as a fisherman. He spent his spare time drawing and painting, and learned basic skills from artist Ásgrímur Jónsson. At age 27 with financial support from fishermen and the Icelandic Confederation of Labour he passed an entrance examination and was admitted to the Royal Danish Academy of Fine Arts for higher education in the arts where he completed his studies. During his time in Copenhagen, he became acquainted with various styles including impressionism, expressionism and cubism, and he also became an accomplished draughtsman. Later he also took trips to France and Italy.

Style
Kjarval was a prolific painter, leaving thousands of drawings and paintings. The paintings vary greatly in style and frequently mix different styles. Although not surreal, some of his works include absurd and symbolist elements, mixing elves and myths into landscape. Many of his works include Icelandic landscapes and lava formations but many of his landscape paintings are partially "cubist" and abstract with his focus on the closest ground rather than the mountains in the background. Later in his life his art frequently also included abstract painting. In 1958, he was awarded the Prince Eugen Medal by the King of Sweden.

Legacy
 In Reykjavík, one of three buildings belonging to the Reykjavík Art Museum is called Kjarvalsstaðir and presents Kjarval's works alongside temporary exhibitions.
 He is depicted on the Icelandic 2000 króna banknote.
 The 1977 debut album Björk by Björk includes an instrumental flute tribute to Kjarval, written and performed by Björk

See also
List of Icelandic visual artists

References

External links

 Kjarvalstaðir (archived on 19 October 2021)

1885 births
1972 deaths
Johannes Sveinsson Kjarval
Modern painters
Johannes Sveinsson Kjarval
Recipients of the Prince Eugen Medal
Johannes Sveinsson Kjarval